The Seychelles National Archives is the national archive of Seychelles and is located in Mahé. Their mission is to "collect, preserve and make accessible archival documents of enduring value through the use of the latest information technology."

It was officially created in 1964.

The archives were originally kept in the same building as the National Library of Seychelles, but after a fungus outbreak in 2012 the archive's location was moved to a different building the following year. The new location is in the Helena Complex in Port Island, with all legal documents housed in the Seychelles Magistrates' Court in Victoria and data entry is in the Providence Atoll.

See also 
 List of national archives

References

External links
Official website

Seychelles
Seychellois culture
History of Seychelles